The French Chef is an American television cooking show created and hosted by Julia Child, produced and broadcast by WGBH, the public television station in Boston, Massachusetts, from February 11, 1963   to January 14, 1973. It was one of the first cooking shows on American television.

The French Chef was first shown with a pilot on July 26, 1962. The immensely popular show went on to air for 206 episodes. It is credited with convincing the American public to try cooking French food at home.

The show grew out of a special presentation Child gave on WGBH based on the book Mastering the Art of French Cooking which she co-authored.  The French Chef was produced from 1963 to 1973 by WGBH for National Educational Television (and later for PBS). Reruns continued on PBS until 1989, and were airing on Cooking Channel as of 2010. As of September 2016, episodes were being rerun on the new Canadian cooking channel Gusto, and later, Makeful.  As recently as March 2017, reruns of the show were also seen on the American Public Television Create channel.

The original episodes were available on the PBS streaming service as of 2020. In July 2021, certain episodes were added to the Pluto TV lineup, together with other Julia Child cooking programs.

Format
The French Chef introduced French cooking to the United States at a time when it was considered expensive restaurant fare, not suitable for home cooking.  Child emphasized fresh and, at the time, unusual ingredients.

All of the recipes used on The French Chef had originally appeared in Mastering the Art of French Cooking, but for the show, Child chose mostly the more domestic recipes from the book, although such showpieces as Beef Wellington, various sorts of soufflé, and some ambitious pastries also made it into the mix if they seemed within the reach of a home cook without staff.

The show was done live-to-videotape from start to finish, leaving little room for mistakes.  The resulting occasional accidents became a popular trademark of Child's on air presence, used as "teachable moments" to encourage viewers to relax about the task's demands.

Certain elements became motifs: Julia's fondness for wine; her distinctive voice; her staunch defense of the use of butter (with margarine invariably referred to as "that other spread") and cream; her standard issue "impeccably clean towel"; and her closing line at the end of every show: "This is Julia Child, Bon appétit!"

History

Child's first appearance cooking on TV had been by happenstance: a guest for another show on WGBH had cancelled their appearance, as did the backup guest. Child was invited to do a cooking demonstration, which received positive feedback and prompted executives to order a pilot.

When the show began, the budget was so low that "volunteers had to be recruited to wash dishes, and the food sometimes had to be auctioned to the audience afterwards to cover expenses."

In 1964 Child received a Peabody Award, crediting her for doing "more than show us how good cooking is achieved; by her delightful demonstrations she has brought the pleasures of good living into many American homes." In May 1966, her show won a Primetime Emmy Award for Achievements in Educational Television – Individuals.

The August 27, 1968 episode of The French Chef (rerun from an episode sometime in 1965) ended with the unexpected collapse of an Apple Charlotte.

The October 31, 1971 episode of The French Chef (on its ninth anniversary) was the first U.S. television show to be captioned for deaf viewers.

The show was produced by Ruth Lockwood and directed by Russell Morash, Russell Fortier, David Griffiths and David B. Atwood. Film composer John Morris wrote the 2nd theme song of The French Chef.

The show eventually became so popular that Child's use of a particular ingredient each week would sometimes cause a surge in demand and lead to grocery stores across the country temporarily selling out of it.

Legacy
As part of its growing Twitch Creative content, Twitch streamed every episode of The French Chef over a four-day period starting on March 15, 2016, to launch its new food channel. Twitch reported that almost a million viewers watched the marathon.

A television series based on Julia Child and the creation of The French Chef premiered on HBO in 2022.

List of episodes

Pilots (1962)
The three pilot episodes were subsequently taped over by the studio, a common practice at the time. No copies are known to exist today.

Season 1 (1963)
Child wrote that the first 13 episodes were lost at one point, but then 7 were found; if so, this would add an additional 6 episodes between episode 7 "Fruit Tarts" and what is listed here as episode 8 "Chicken Breasts and Rice" (which would have actually been episode 14).

Season 2 (1963-1964)

Season 3 (1964-1965)

Season 4 (1965)

Season 5 (1965-1966)

Season 6 (1966)

Season 7 (1970-1971)

Season 8 (1971)

Season 9 (1971-1972)

Season 10 (1972-1973)

Companion books
Two companion cookbooks were written along with the show. The French Chef Cookbook was a show-by-show breakdown of the black and white series, while From Julia Child's Kitchen was a somewhat more ambitious work that was based on the color series but also added considerable extra material.

DVD releases

Julia Child's Kitchen Wisdom (2000)
Julia and Jacques: Cooking at Home (2003)
Julia Child: America's Favorite Chef (2004)
The French Chef: Volume One (2005)
The French Chef: Volume Two (2005)
The French Chef with Julia Child (As Seen on Public Television). WGBH 2005  3 DVDs, runtime 432 min. (2005)
Julia Child! The French Chef (2006)
The French Chef: Julia Child's French Classics (2012)

References

External links

Cover: Julia Child – Nov. 25, 1966 from Time magazine

1960s American cooking television series
1970s American cooking television series
Black-and-white American television shows
Television series by WGBH
PBS original programming
1963 American television series debuts
1973 American television series endings
Cookbooks
Peabody Award-winning television programs
Alfred A. Knopf books